State Mental Hospital may refer to:

State Hospital, in England, UK

Worcester State Hospital, Worcester, Massachusetts, which has been known as "State Mental Hospital"
Utah State Hospital, Provo, Utah, USA, known formerly as "State Mental Hospital"